Charlottendal is a historic building and estate situated south of Slagelse, Denmark. Created by Constantin Brun in 1799, it is today part of Antvorskov Barracks.

History

Early owners, 17971810

Antvorskov Hovedgård was in 1799 acquired by Constantin Brun.  He imported several families from Switzerland and established a production of Swiss cheese which was mainly exported to oversea markets. He also marketed chopping and threshing machines. Bruun was married to Friederike Brun, a leading salonist of her time.

Bruun created four small estates from part of the land that had previously belonged to Antvorskov Hovedgård, naming them Charlottendal, Augustendal, Idagaard and Karlsgaard, of which the latter four were named after his children. The four new manors were sold to Adam Wilhelm Hauch and Marcus Frederik Voigt in 1806. Charlottendal was sold to Frederik Nielsen Bøgvad (17411821) in 1809.

Frisch family, 18101847
 
In 1810, Charlottendal was acquired by Hartvig Frisch. Frisch served as director of the Royal Greenland Trading Department. He was also the owner of the Frisch House at Nytorv 5 in Copenhagen and of Vodroffgård outside the city. In 1815 he also purchased Augustendal.

Upon on Frisch's death, Charlottendal and Augustendal were passed down to his sons Frederik Emil and Constantin Frisch. In 1823 Constantin Frisch bought his brother's share of the estates. He merged them into a single estate under the name Charlottendal.

Neergaard family
In 1847, Constantin Frisch sold Charlottendal to Carl de Neergaard. He was already the owner of Gunderslevholm and Kastrupgård.

Carl de Neergaard died without children on 2 August 1850. His eldest brother's children drew lots for his estates with Kastrup and Charlottendal going to Charles Adolf Denis de Neergaard. He constructed the current main building of the Charlottendal estate. In 1862, Neergaard also purchased Gyldenholm Manor. The author and educator  wrote his first poetry while working as a tutor on Charlottendal in 18631864.

On Charles Adolph Denis de Neergaard's death in 1903, Gyldenholm and Kastrupgård passed to his eldest son Carl. In 1908, Charlottendal was ceded to the younger brother Viggo de Neergaard. He had recently also purchased nearby Valdemarskilde. In 1920, he also purchased Lille Frederikslund. He was married two times, first to Karen Blixen's sister Inger Benedicte Dinesen and later to Elisabeth Lina Perrochet. He was a stakeholder and board member of Blixen's Karen Coffee Company Ltd.

Architecture
The main building is a one-storey brick building with a gabled median risalit and a red tile roof. It is flanked by two detached secondary wings.

Surroundings
The garden is located to the west of the main building. The estate comprises a number of smaller woodlands, including Slagelse Lystskov, Karlsgaard skov, Nykobbel, Kalven and Charlottendal skov. Two lakes, Grønsø and Rørsø, are located in Charlottendal Skov. A larger lake known as Ny Sø, which was the site of a watermill, has been reclaimed.

List of owners
 (1799–1806) Constantin Brun
 (1806–1808) 
 (1806–1808) Marcus Frederik Voigt
 (1808–1810) Frederik Nielsen Bøgvad
 (1810–1817) Hartvig Frisch
 (1817–1823) Frederik Emil Frisch
 (1817–1847) Constantin Frisch
 (1847–1850) Carl de Neergaard
 (1850–1903) Charles Adolph Denis de Neergaard
 (1908– ) Viggo de Neergaard
 (1969– ) Antvorskov Barracks

References

Further reading
 Olrik, H.G.: Brorupgaard i Ludvig Holbergs Eje. 1946.

Buildings and structures in Slagelse Municipality
Buildings and structures associated with the Neergaard family